Lesbian, gay, bisexual, transgender (LGBT) persons in Burkina Faso face legal issues not experienced by non-LGBT citizens. Same-sex sexual acts between men and between women are legal in Burkina Faso.

Laws regarding same-sex sexual acts

Both male and female same-sex sexual activity has always been legal in Burkina Faso. Since 1996, the age of consent is equal and set at 18, regardless of gender.

Recognition of same-sex unions

The Constitution of Burkina Faso does not authorize same-sex marriage and defines marriage as a union between a man and a woman.
La famille est la cellule de base de la société. L’Etat lui doit protection. Le mariage est fondé sur le libre consentement de l’homme et de la femme. Toute discrimination fondée sur la race, la couleur, la religion, l’ethnie, la caste, l’origine sociale, la fortune est interdite en matière de mariage. Les enfants sont égaux en droits et en devoirs dans leurs relations familiales. Les parents ont le droit naturel et le devoir d’élever et d’éduquer leurs enfants. Ceux-ci leur doivent respect et assistance.
Translated into English, the Constitution says:
The family is the basic cell of society. The State owes protection. Marriage is based on the free consent of man and woman. Any discrimination based on race, color, religion, ethnicity, caste, social origin, fortune is forbidden in marriage. Children are equal in rights and duties in family relationships. Parents have the natural right and duty to bring up and educate their children. They owe them respect and assistance.

Adoption and family planning

According to the U.S. Department of State, "Married, cohabiting, heterosexual couples who have been married for at least five years may adopt a child. Single applicants are almost never permitted to adopt children in Burkina Faso."

Living conditions
The U.S. Department of State's 2011 Human Rights Report found that,

The law does not discriminate on the basis of sexual orientation in employment and occupation, housing, statelessness, or access to education or health care. However, societal discrimination based on sexual orientation and gender identity remained a problem. Religious and traditional beliefs do not accept homosexuality, and lesbian, gay, bisexual, and transgender (LGBT) persons were reportedly occasional victims of verbal and physical abuse. There were no reports that the government responded to societal violence and discrimination against such persons. LGBT organizations had no legal presence in the country but existed unofficially. There were no reports of government or societal violence against such organizations.

HIV/AIDS
HIV/AIDS has a relatively low presence in Burkina Faso when compared to other African nations, with 0.80% of adults aged 15–49 infected by the virus. However, HIV remains a threat to the approximately 94,000 people infected as an estimated 65% of adult citizens living with HIV in Burkina Faso have access to antiretroviral drugs. Furthermore, only 28% of children aged 0–14 have access to antiretroviral drugs, a number that trails many African nations. Despite this, antiretroviral coverage has significantly improved in the country, as the estimated coverage for all ages was 32% in 2010.

Summary table

See also

Human rights in Burkina Faso
LGBT rights in Africa

References

Human rights in Burkina Faso
Politics of Burkina Faso
Law of Burkina Faso
Burkina Faso
LGBT in Burkina Faso